An orc is a mythological and fictional creature.

Orc or ORC may also refer to:

Mythical monsters and races
 Orc (Warcraft)
 Orc (Warhammer)
 l'Orco, a sea monster in the poem Orlando Furioso
 Orsimer or orcs, in The Elder Scrolls computer games

Acronyms
 Odd radio circle, unexplained astronomical object
 Odonata Records Committee, verifies dragonflies in the UK
 Offshore Racing Congress, for maritime yacht racing
 Offshore Raiding Craft, a boat operated by the Royal Marines
 Ohio Revised Code, statutes of the U.S. state of Ohio
 Opinion Research Corporation, a polling and market research company
 O.R.C., postnominal letters for members of the Canons Regular of the Holy Cross of Coimbra
 Order of Railway Conductors, an American trade union
 Organic Rankine Cycle
 Organized retail crime
 Origin recognition complex, a protein complex 
 Otago Regional Council, New Zealand

Transport
 ORC, Antrak station code for Oregon City (Amtrak station), Oregon, United States
 ORC, IATA airport code for Orocue Airport, Orocue, Colombia
 ORC, MRT station abbreviation for Orchard MRT station, Singapore
 Ottoman Railway Company

Other uses
 Apache ORC, a file format
 Orc (album), an album by Oh Sees
 Orc (Blake), a character in the work of William Blake
 Orc (programming language)
 Orcs: First Blood, a series of books by Stan Nicholls
 Pejorative name for Russian troops in the Russo-Ukrainian War

See also
Ork (disambiguation)
Orca